Thomas Lee Wallace (born October 8, 1949) is an American film producer, director, editor and screenwriter. He is best known for his work in the horror genre, directing films such as Halloween III: Season of the Witch and Fright Night Part 2 and also directing the 1990 television miniseries adaptation of Stephen King's epic horror novel It. He is a long-time collaborator of director John Carpenter, receiving his first credit as art director on Carpenter's directorial debut Dark Star. Along with Charles Bornstein, he edited both the original Halloween film and The Fog.

Early life
Born Thomas Lee Wallace in Somerset, Kentucky to Robert G. and Kathleen Wallace, he has one older sister, Linda. He grew up in Bowling Green, Kentucky, and attended high school at Western Kentucky University teachers training school (College High).

Education
 BFA in Design from Ohio University, Athens, Ohio
 MFA program (five semesters) in film production at University of Southern California, Los Angeles, California

Early career
Wallace entered the film business while attending USC film school, starting as an art director and film editor for commercials and industrial films.  While in school, he began collaborating with childhood friend and fellow student John Carpenter, working on Carpenter's Dark Star (1974), a low-budget, science-fiction comedy that began as a student film. In 1976, he worked as sound effects editor and art director on Carpenter's second film, Assault on Precinct 13.  He continued working with Carpenter, serving as production designer and co-editor of Halloween (1978) and The Fog (1980). In addition to his behind-the-scenes duties for these last two films, Wallace also appeared in front of the camera: intermittently as The Shape (the masked Michael Myers in the closet scene) in Halloween, and in The Fog as several different ghosts; his voice was also featured in both films as TV/radio announcers.

Directorial debut
For Halloween II, John Carpenter (who was producing) initially offered directorial responsibilities to Wallace. After careful deliberation, Wallace declined, citing disappointment with the script (the job eventually went to Rick Rosenthal). He did, however, agree to write and direct the third film in the franchise, Halloween III: Season of the Witch, which was the first and only one to deviate from the Michael Myers storyline (Wallace's voice was also featured as the announcer and the munchkin singers in the "Silver Shamrock" commercial).

Later work
Throughout the 1980s and 1990s, Wallace continued to write and direct for television and film. Notable work includes writing the screenplay for 1982's Amityville II: The Possession; co-writing and directing 1988's Fright Night Part 2 starring Roddy McDowell; and adapting and directing the 1990 television miniseries adaptation of Stephen King's epic horror novel It.

Wallace's work in television was varied, including directing episodes of the cult TV series Max Headroom; the 1980s revival of The Twilight Zone; and Baywatch. At the height of television film popularity in the 1990s, Wallace directed several notable films, including an adaptation of the Vincent Bugliosi novel, And the Sea Will Tell (1991), The Comrades of Summer (1992), Steel Chariots (1997), and The Spree (1998).

In 1983, he co-wrote a second draft of the film adaptation of the 1980 novel The Ninja with Carpenter. In 1986, he performed the title song of Carpenter's film Big Trouble in Little China as part of the band The Coup de Villes, alongside Carpenter and another friend, Nick Castle.

Personal life
Wallace is divorced from actress Nancy Kyes, with whom he has two children. He still lives in California and continues to write.

Filmography

Films

Television series

Awards

Further reading
 "The Devil (and Dino) Made Him Do It!" by Lee Gambin, Fangoria magazine No. 317, October 2012, pages 58–59. 97. Interview of screenwriter Tommy Lee Wallace regarding his scripting of Amityville II: The Possession. Three-page article has five photos, one of Wallace.

References

External links

1949 births
Film directors from Kentucky
Horror film directors
Living people
People from Somerset, Kentucky
Ohio University alumni
American art directors
American production designers
American film editors
American male screenwriters
Screenwriters from Kentucky
Film producers from Kentucky